Cosmotoma fasciata is a species of longhorn beetles of the subfamily Lamiinae. It was described by Fisher in 1931, and is found across Honduras to Panama, and western Ecuador.

References

Beetles described in 1931
Cosmotoma